General Maritime Corporation operates crude oil tankers, mostly in the Atlantic Ocean and in the Caribbean, Mediterranean, Black, and North Seas. Founded in 1997 by current CEO Peter Georgiopoulos,  the company is the second largest (based on cargo capacity) operator of mid-size tankers. In 2003 the company gross revenues were 454 million US dollars and they had 345 employees; the company is incorporated in the Republic of the Marshall Islands.

In 17 November 2011 the company filed for Chapter 11 bankruptcy protection, after oversupply in the shipping industry caused it to lose money for at least eight quarters. In April 2012 General Maritime came out of bankruptcy as a result of investment from Oaktree Capital Management. Prior to its bankruptcy, General Maritime stock traded on the over-the-counter Pink Sheets (OTCBB) under the ticker symbol "GMRRQ", but has since been completely delisted and gone private. In the year prior to its bankruptcy, General Maritime's stock price shed 95% of its value.

There are currently 31 ships in the fleet; the fleet grew over 50% in 2003. The first name of every ship in the fleet is a contraction of the company name, "Genmar". The fleet is fairly new, with only 10 built before 1990, and the oldest built in March 1985. Most of the fleet is double-hulled or double-sided; only 9 are single-hulled, after recently selling two single-hulled boats. Twenty-three are in the Aframax size category (75,000 – , and 19 are in the Suezmax class ( – ).

Customers include international oil companies such as 76, 66, Chevron, Shell, BP, ExxonMobil and ConocoPhillips.

References

External links
General Maritime Corporate Web site

Tanker shipping companies
Companies that filed for Chapter 11 bankruptcy in 2011